The Geely Emgrand S and the original Geely Emgrand GS is a compact crossover, produced by the Chinese auto brand Geely, under the Emgrand brand. 

The original design of the Emgrand GS production car launched in 2016 was previewed by the Emgrand Crossover Concept unveiled at the 2014 Beijing Auto Show. The whole Emgrand series was originally planned as a premium brand of Geely and was launched in 2009 before being repositioned as a product series with the logo being adapted as the new logo of the entire Geely brand.

First generation (Emgrand GS)

Originally launched as the Geely Emgrand GS, the compact crossover is developed from the same platform of the Geely Emgrand GL midsize sedan. Price of the Emgrand GS ranges from 77,800 yuan to 108,800 yuan.

Geely Emgrand GSe
Revealed in 2018, the Geely Emgrand GSe is the full electric variant of the Geely Emgrand GS crossover. Prices after subsidies starts from 119,800 to 145,800 yuan. Fast charging on a 60 kW fast charger takes half an hour and charges from 30% to 80%, a full charge at 220V would takes 9 hours. The  acceleration of the Geely Emgrand GSe takes 9.9 seconds.

Second generation (Emgrand S)

The interior of the Emgrand S is restyled with a new dashboard design and a 10.25-inch touchscreen that incorporates the infotainment system is placed above the air vents above the engine start/stop button and HVAC switches.

The engine is paired with either a six-speed manual transmission or a CVT gearbox.

References

External links

GS
Mid-size cars
Front-wheel-drive vehicles
Cars of China
Cars introduced in 2016
2010s cars
Production electric cars